Brakpan is a mining town in the Gauteng province of South Africa.

History
The name Brakpan comes from a small pan on a farm called Weltevreden, which was filled with very brackish water and was probably referred to as the "brakpan," and it was near this pan that the first settlement started. In 1888, a coal seam was discovered and a coal mine under the name of Brakpan Collieries was started. When a railway line was constructed from Germiston to Springs, Brakpan became one of the stations along the route.

With gold fever running high on the Witwatersrand in the early years of the twentieth century, it was not long before gold was discovered. In 1905, Brakpan Mines Company sunk its first two gold mining shafts. This was higher than any of the pyramids of Egypt except the Pyramid of Cheops.

From 1905 the village began to grow rapidly, remaining a suburb of Benoni until 1912 when it was granted the status of a municipality and proclaimed as a town. Brakpan's central position makes it a good distribution centre for industry, especially engineering works and foundries. In the late 1990s the municipality approved the construction of a huge casino and entertainment complex, Carnival City, which opened the town to tourists and provided much-needed jobs for the people.

The first activity which drew people to the area was the British coal mining in 1888 and the large coal powered power station also built by the British. A tram line to Johannesburg was built at this time to service the power station.

The Main Reef Road (today part of the R29) linked Brakpan to all the other mining towns in the Witwatersrand. Brakpan was a suburb of Benoni from 1914–1919, when it was granted municipal status. The Brakpan miners were involved in the miners' strike of 1922. The town has gradually lost its importance as a gold mining area as the surrounding mines suffered from low yield over high cost. Many British residents emigrated during the apartheid era leaving a vacuum in the town which was filled by mostly Afrikaner farmers who had lost interest in farming.

Situated between Springs and Benoni, it forms part of the Ekurhuleni Metro. The main road through town is Voortrekker Street.

Brakpan is often used in memes in South African online communities, often depicted in a way similar to Southern US locations in US centric memes.

References

 
Populated places in Ekurhuleni
Mining communities in South Africa